A Doll's House is a 1943 Argentine drama film directed by Ernesto Arancibia and starring Delia Garcés and George Rigaud. It is based on the play A Doll's House by Henrik Ibsen. At the 1944 Argentine Film Critics Association Awards, Alberto López won the Best Sound for the film.

Cast
Delia Garcés
George Rigaud
Sebastián Chiola
Orestes Caviglia
Alita Román
Angelina Pagano
Olga Casares Pearson
Mirtha Reid
Jeannet Morel
Agustín Barrios

Reception
Calki stated in El Mundo that the film is "too lost in a modern framework" in the adaptation by the local cinema, while the critic of La Nación believed that the film had much dignity as an interpretative work, calling it an "interesting and neat version". Raúl Manrupe and María Alejandra Portela later opined that it was the right film at the time but that it now looks dated and static.

References

External links
 

1943 films
1940s Spanish-language films
Argentine black-and-white films
Films directed by Ernesto Arancibia
Argentine drama films
1943 drama films
Films based on A Doll's House
1940s Argentine films